Something reincarnated is the subject of reincarnation.

Reincarnated may also refer to:

 Reincarnated (TV series), a Hong-Kong TV series
 Reincarnated (album), a 2013 album by Snoop Dogg
 Reincarnated (film), a documentary film featuring Snoop Dogg

See also 

 Reincarnation (disambiguation)